The 2017–18 ABL season is the eighth season of competition of the ASEAN Basketball League. The regular season started on 17 November 2017 and ended on 28 March 2018.

Teams
Five teams from the 2016–2017 ABL season returned for this season. One team, the Kaohsiung Truth, disbanded prior to the season. One team, Mono Vampire, returned after skipping last season, having played in the 2015–16 ABL season. The team plans to  concurrently play in the ABL and in the Thailand Basketball League for the upcoming season. Three teams were accepted as new members: Nanhai Long-Lions, Formosa Dreamers and CLS Knights Surabaya. The Long-Lions are the developmental team of the Guangzhou Long-Lions, the Dreamers are an expansion team from Taiwan, and the Knights left the Indonesian Basketball League to play in the ABL.

Prior their first game, the Nanhai Long-Lions renamed themselves as the Nanhai Kung Fu. After partnering with Macau's Grupo Desportivo Chong Son they changed their name once again to Chong Son Kung Fu days before the season started.

Alab Pilipinas renamed their team as the Tanduay Alab Pilipinas after securing a sponsorship deal with Asia Brewery, prior the season started.

CLS Knights Surabaya renamed their team as "CLS Knights Indonesia" prior the season started.

Tanduay Alab Pilipinas was renamed as "San Miguel Alab Pilipinas" by 1 February 2018, when the primary sponsor was changed from Tanduay to San Miguel Beer Pale Pilsen.

Venues and locations

Personnel

Imports
The following is the list of imports, which had played for their respective teams at least once. In the left are the World Imports, and in the right are the ASEAN/Heritage Imports. Flags indicate the citizenship/s the player holds.

Each team is allowed to sign two types of imports at most on its roster.

Regular season
Each team will play 20 games throughout the season, 10 at home and 10 away. Each team will play 8 other teams twice, home and away, for a total of 16 games, plus 4 more games against two teams, also home and away, taking the total to 20 games. This is how the teams were grouped on which teams will play each other four times:
 Chong Son, Eastern, Formosa
 CLS, Alab, Singapore
 Malaysia, Mono, Saigon

Standings

Results

First and second rounds

Third and fourth rounds

Playoffs

Quarter-finals
The quarterfinals is a best-of-three series, with the higher seeded team hosting Game 1, and 3, if necessary.

Semi-finals
The semifinals is a best-of-three series, with the higher seeded team hosting Game 1, and 3, if necessary.

Finals

The finals is a best-of-five series, with the higher seeded team hosting Game 1, 2, and 5, if necessary.

Awards

Finals awards

End-of-season awards 
The winners were announced before Game 2 of the 2018 ABL Finals at the City of Santa Rosa Multi-Purpose Complex in Santa Rosa, Laguna, Philippines.
Most Valuable Players:
Local: Bobby Ray Parks Jr. (San Miguel Alab Pilipinas)
Heritage Import: Mikh McKinney (Chong Son Kung Fu)
World Import: Anthony Tucker (Chong Son Kung Fu)
Defensive Player of the Year: Renaldo Balkman (San Miguel Alab Pilipinas) and Chris Charles (Singapore Slingers)
Coach of the Year: Charles Dube-Brais (Chong Son Kung Fu)

Players of the Week

Local players

Heritage imports

World imports

Statistical leaders

Individual season leaders

References

External links
 Official website

 
2017–18 in Asian basketball leagues
2017-18
2017–18 in Chinese basketball
2017–18 in Hong Kong basketball
2017–18 in Indonesian basketball
2017–18 in Malaysian basketball
2017–18 in Philippine basketball leagues
2017–18 in Singaporean basketball
2017–18 in Taiwanese basketball
2017–18 in Thai basketball
2017–18 in Vietnamese basketball